Extra Moments is an album by former Survivor members Jimi Jamison and Jim Peterik, released on July 23, 2010 by MelodicRock Records. The album contains demos and unused songs from the Crossroads Moment recording sessions that Jamison and Peterik originally put together to benefit melodicrock.com. The album was released in Australia, Russia and rest of Europe.

Track listing

References 

2010 albums
Jimi Jamison albums
Jim Peterik albums